HD 111968, also known by the Bayer designation n Centauri, is a single star in the southern constellation of Centaurus. It is a white-hued star that is faintly visible to the naked eye with an apparent visual magnitude of +4.25. The star is located at a distance of approximately 149 light years from the Sun based on parallax. The radial velocity of the star is poorly constrained, with an estimated value of 2.5 km/s.

This is classified as an A-type star but there has been disagreement about the luminosity class. A. de Vaucouleurs in 1957 found a class of III, suggesting this is an evolved giant star. O. J. Eggen gave a class of V in 1962, as did R. O. Gray and R. F. Garrison in 1989, indicating this is a main sequence star. In 1979, N. Houk found a class of IV, meaning this is a subgiant star.

HD 111968 is a young star, some 400 million years old, with 1.6 times the mass of the Sun. It is spinning with a projected rotational velocity of 92 km/s. The star is radiating 34 times the luminosity of the Sun from its photosphere at an effective temperature of 7,835 K.

References 

A-type giants
Centaurus (constellation)
Centauri, n
Durchmusterung objects
Gliese and GJ objects
111968
062896
4889